Malaya Rukavitskaya is a rural locality (a village) and the administrative center of Semizerye Rural Settlement, Kaduysky District, Vologda Oblast, Russia. The population was 283 as of 2002. There are 6 streets.

Geography 
Malaya Rukavitskaya is located 3 km east of Kaduy (the district's administrative centre) by road. Kaduy is the nearest rural locality.

References 

Rural localities in Kaduysky District